The 2017 ATP World Tour was the global elite men's professional tennis circuit organized by the Association of Tennis Professionals (ATP) for the 2017 tennis season. The 2017 ATP World Tour calendar comprised the Grand Slam tournaments (supervised by the International Tennis Federation (ITF)), the ATP World Tour Masters 1000, the ATP Finals, the ATP World Tour 500 series, the ATP World Tour 250 series and the Davis Cup (organized by the ITF). Also included in the 2017 calendar are the Hopman Cup and the Next Gen ATP Finals, which do not distribute ranking points.

Schedule
This is the complete schedule of events on the 2017 calendar.

January

February

March

April

May

June

July

August

September

October

November

Statistical information
These tables present the number of singles (S), doubles (D), and mixed doubles (X) titles won by each player and each nation during the season, within all the tournament categories of the 2017 ATP World Tour: the Grand Slam tournaments, the ATP Finals, the ATP World Tour Masters 1000, the ATP World Tour 500 series, and the ATP World Tour 250 series. The players/nations are sorted by:
 Total number of titles (a doubles title won by two players representing the same nation counts as only one win for the nation);
 Cumulated importance of those titles (one Grand Slam win equalling two Masters 1000 wins, one undefeated ATP Finals win equalling one-and-a-half Masters 1000 win, one Masters 1000 win equalling two 500 events wins, one 500 event win equalling two 250 events wins);
 A singles > doubles > mixed doubles hierarchy;
 Alphabetical order (by family names for players).

Titles won by player

Titles won by nation

Titles information

The following players won their first main circuit title in singles, doubles or mixed doubles:
Singles
 Gilles Müller – Sydney (draw)
 Ryan Harrison – Memphis (draw)
 Borna Ćorić – Marrakesh (draw)
 Yūichi Sugita – Antalya (draw)
 Andrey Rublev – Umag (draw)
 Peter Gojowczyk – Metz (draw)
 Damir Džumhur – St. Petersburg (draw)

Doubles
 Thanasi Kokkinakis – Brisbane (draw)
 Jordan Thompson – Brisbane (draw)
 Jeevan Nedunchezhiyan – Chennai (draw)
 Alexander Zverev – Montpellier (draw)
 Brian Baker – Memphis (draw)
 Nikola Mektić – Memphis (draw)
 Rogério Dutra Silva – São Paulo (draw)
 Roman Jebavý – Istanbul (draw)
 Ben McLachlan – Tokyo (draw)
 Yasutaka Uchiyama – Tokyo (draw)

Mixed doubles
 Juan Sebastián Cabal – Australian Open (draw)
 Rohan Bopanna – French Open (draw)

The following players defended a main circuit title in singles, doubles, or mixed doubles:
Singles
 Novak Djokovic – Doha (draw)
 Víctor Estrella Burgos – Quito (draw)
 Pablo Cuevas – São Paulo (draw)
 Rafael Nadal – Monte Carlo (draw), Barcelona (draw)
 Stan Wawrinka – Geneva (draw)
 Juan Martín del Potro – Stockholm (draw)

Doubles
 Juan Sebastián Cabal – Buenos Aires (draw)
 Robert Farah – Buenos Aires (draw)
 Henri Kontinen – ATP Finals (draw)
 John Peers – ATP Finals (draw)

Top Ten entry
The following players entered the Top Ten for the first time in their careers:

Singles
 David Goffin (entered at No. 10 on 20 February)
 Alexander Zverev (entered at No. 10 on 22 May)
 Pablo Carreño Busta (entered at No. 10 on 11 September)
 Jack Sock (entered at No. 9 on 6 November)

ATP rankings
These are the ATP rankings and yearly ATP Race rankings of the top 20 singles players, doubles players and doubles teams at the end of the 2017 season.

Singles

No. 1 ranking

Doubles

No. 1 ranking

Prize money leaders

Best matches by ATPWorldTour.com

Best 5 Grand Slam matches

Best 5 ATP World Tour matches

Point distribution

Retirements 
 Martín Alund (born 26 December 1985, in Mendoza, Argentina) joined the professional tour in 2004, and reached his career-high singles ranking of no. 84 in 2013. Alund played mostly on the secondary ATP Challenger Tour and the ITF Men's Circuit, retiring in January after a year of injury.
 Somdev Devvarman (born 13 February 1985, in Agartala, India) joined the professional tour in 2008, and reached a career-high singles ranking of no. 62 in 2011. Studying in the United States, Devvarman won two consecutive NCAA Men's Tennis Championships (2007–08), collecting an unprecedented win–loss record of 44–1 in 2008. He made two ATP finals, but found his largest success outside the main tour, clinching gold medals at the Commonwealth Games and Asian Games in 2010. He announced his retirement in January after not playing for a year.
 Colin Fleming (born 13 August 1984, in Broxburn, United Kingdom) joined the professional tour in 2003 and reached a career-high doubles ranking of world no. 17, winning a Commonwealth Games gold medal in mixed doubles in 2010. He announced his retirement on 16 January 2017.
 Giovanni Lapentti (born 25 January 1983, in Guayaquil, Ecuador) joined the professional tour in 2002 and reached a career-high singles ranking of no. 110 in 2005. He never won any singles and doubles titles in ATP tournaments, having played mostly on the ATP Challenger Tour. He announced that he would retire after the Ecuador Open.
 Juan Mónaco (born 29 March 1984, in Tandil, Argentina) joined the professional tour in 2002, won nine ATP titles, reaching his career-high singles ranking of no. 10 in 2012 as well as also becoming a Davis Cup Champion in 2016. He announced his retirement in May.
 Albert Montañés (born 26 November 1980, in Sant Carles de la Ràpita, Spain) joined the professional tour in 1999, won six ATP 250 titles, and had a career-high singles ranking of 22, achieved in 2010. He announced that the Barcelona Open would be his final tournament.
 Grega Žemlja (born 29 September 1986, in Kranj, Slovenia) joined the professional tour in 2009 and reached a career-high singles ranking of no. 43 in 2013. He was runner-up at the 2012 Erste Bank Open. He announced that the Tilia Slovenia Open would be his final tournament.
 Benjamin Becker (born 16 June 1981, in Merzig, Germany) joined the professional tour in 2004, and reached his career-high singles ranking of no. 35 in 2014. Becker won one singles title in 2009 in Ordina Open in 's-Hertogenbosch and recorded six top 10 wins in his career. He is also known for being the last player to play and beat Andre Agassi in the latter's final US Open in 2006 in the third round. Becker announced his retirement and intent to return to studies at Baylor University in September 2017.
 Mariusz Fyrstenberg (born 8 July 1980, in Warsaw, Poland) joined the professional tour in 2001, won eighteen doubles titles and reached a career-high doubles ranking of world no. 6 in 2012. He was runner-up at the 2011 US Open and 2011 ATP World Tour Finals, alongside fellow Pole Marcin Matkowski. He announced his retirement after the finish of the Pekao Szczecin Open.
 Marco Chiudinelli (born 10 September 1981, in Basel, Switzerland) joined the professional tour in 2000, and reached a career-high singles of no. 52. In 2009, he won the Allianz Suisse Open Gstaad doubles title with partner Michael Lammer and later became a Davis Cup Champion in 2014. He announced his retirement after the conclusion of Swiss Indoors where, also in 2009, he managed to reach the semi-finals in singles.
 Paul-Henri Mathieu (born 12 January 1982, in Strasbourg, France) joined the professional tour in 1999 and reached a career-high singles ranking of no. 12. In 2002, Mathieu won his first two ATP Tour titles in back-to-back weeks. Mathieu won in Moscow, beating world no. 4 Marat Safin in the semi-finals en route, before he then headed to Lyon, where he beat Brazilian Gustavo Kuerten for the title. By the end of his career, he would have 4 career titles to his name. He announced his retirement after his singles qualifying match at the 2017 Rolex Paris Masters.
 Radek Štěpánek (born 27 November 1978, in Karviná, Czechoslovakia) joined the professional tour in 1996 and reached a career-high singles ranking of no. 8 and a career-high doubles ranking of no. 4. He won 5 singles titles and 18 doubles titles, including the 2012 Australian Open and 2013 US Open doubles titles with Leander Paes. Along with Lucie Hradecká, he also won the bronze medal at the 2016 Olympic Games in the mixed doubles event as well, having previously won consecutive Davis Cups with the Czech Republic in 2012 and 2013. He announced his retirement due to an injury in November of this year.
 Dmitry Tursunov (born 12 December 1982, in Moscow, Soviet Union) joined the professional tour in 2000 and reached a career-high singles ranking of no. 20. He won 7 singles titles.

Comebacks
Following is a list of notable players (winners of a main tour title, and/or part of the ATP rankings top 100 [singles] or top 50 [doubles] for at least one week) who returned from retirement, announced their retirement from professional tennis, became inactive (after not playing for more than 52 weeks), or were permanently banned from playing, during the 2017 season:

 Nicolás Lapentti (born 13 August 1976, in Guayaquil, Ecuador) joined the professional tour in 1995 and reached a career-high singles ranking of world no. 6. Initially retiring in 2011, Lapentti returned for the final event of his brother Giovanni's career, partnering him in the doubles draw.
 Juan Carlos Ferrero (born 12 February 1980, in Ontinyent, Spain) joined the professional tour in 1998 and reached a career-high singles ranking of world no. 1 in 2003, also winning the French Open in that very same year. Initially retiring in 2012, Ferrero made a comeback at the Barcelona Open, partnering Pablo Carreño Busta in the doubles draw.

See also

2017 WTA Tour
2017 ATP Challenger Tour
Association of Tennis Professionals
International Tennis Federation

References

External links
Association of Tennis Professionals (ATP) World Tour official website
International Tennis Federation (ITF) official website

 
ATP Tour seasons
ATP World Tour